Svetlana Grankovskaya (also spelt Svetlana Grankovskaia, born 22 February 1976) is a Ukrainian track racing cyclist from Kharkiv, and four times world champion. Despite being born in Ukraine, independent since 1991, she has represented Russia at world championships, Summer Olympics and World Cup events.

She missed a bronze medal at the 2004 Summer Olympics, losing the sprint in the final against Anna Meares of Australia.

Palmarès

2001
1st Sprint, Track World Championships

2002
2nd Sprint, 2002 Track World Cup, Monterrey
3rd Keirin, 2002 Track World Cup, Monterrey
2nd Sprint, 2002 Track World Cup, Moscow

2003
1st Sprint, Track World Championships
1st Keirin, Track World Championships

2004
1st Sprint, Track World Championships
1st Sprint, 2004 Track World Cup, Moscow
1st Team Sprint, 2004 Track World Cup, Moscow (with Oksana Grichina)
4th Summer Olympics
2008
3rd Team Sprint, Round 1, 2008–2009 Track World Cup, Manchester

References

1976 births
Living people
Russian female cyclists
Cyclists at the 2004 Summer Olympics
Cyclists at the 2008 Summer Olympics
Olympic cyclists of Russia
Sportspeople from Kharkiv
UCI Track Cycling World Champions (women)
Russian track cyclists
21st-century Russian women